Chao Phraya Yommarat Hospital is the main hospital of Suphan Buri Province, Thailand and is classified under the Ministry of Public Health as a regional hospital. It is an affiliated hospital of the Faculty of Medicine Ramathibodi Hospital, Mahidol University.

History 
Chao Phraya Yommarat Hospital was built in 1926 by money donated by Chao Phraya Yommarat (Pan Sukhum), minister of Suphan Buri as a two-storey concrete building, overlooking the Tha Chin River. In 1942, the hospital became a provincial hospital, became managed by the Ministry of Public Health and expanded to have Surgery, Internal Medicine and Obstetrics and Gynaecology buildings. An ER unit was added in 1991.

The hospital became classified as a regional hospital in 2001, then with 503 beds and has since expanded to 721 beds as of 2022.

See also 

Healthcare in Thailand
 Hospitals in Thailand
 List of hospitals in Thailand

References 
The article incorporates material from the corresponding article in the Thai wikipedia.

Hospitals in Thailand
Suphan Buri province